Lindenbach is a river of Upper Austria.

The Lindenbach springs southwest of Schardenberg. It is a right tributary of the Inn at Wernstein am Inn.

References

Rivers of Upper Austria
Rivers of Austria